Ronald Pieper (1978) is a Dutchman convicted for the murder of air hostess Christel Ambrosius in Putten in 1994. After allegedly fleeing the scene, two other suspects were arrested by the police. Although innocent, the latter two served a prison sentence of 10 years. After their release Ronald Pieper, was arrested in 2008, based on DNA testing which linked him to the victim. He was sentenced to an 18-year sentence. During his imprisonment he allegedly confessed the murder on student Anneke van der Stap in 2005 in Rijswijk to a fellow convict.

From the beginning there were people who expressed doubt about the guilt of the two convicts. Interest in this case was kept alive by Dutch investigative journalist Peter R. de Vries who later would become known internationally for his role in solving the case of Natalee Holloway. The assassination of De Vries in July 2021 is not thought to be related to either case.

Dutch philosopher of science Ton Derksen seriously questions the validity of the evidence in both the case against the two earlier convicts and the case against Ronald Pieper. He pleads for a retrial of both cases in his book Dubbel gedwaald (Double error), published in December 2017. 

The judicial error in the conviction of the first two suspects already aroused a discussion as how the police had done their research. According to Derksen a structural reconsideration of the criminal law system in The Netherlands is necessary. Investigations can be dominated by confirmation bias in order to support a prejudiced approach of a certain suspects, rather than an open minded search for the truth on the circumstances and facts of a crime.

References 
 
 

Dutch people convicted of murder
20th-century Dutch criminals
People convicted of murder by the Netherlands
Living people
1978 births